JPF may refer to one of the following

Journeyman Pipefitter
Japonica Polonica Fantastica
Java Pathfinder, a system to verify executable Java bytecode programs
Jeunesse Populaire Française, a French youth fascist organization of 1940s
JPEG 2000, a digital image format (file extension .jpf)